Kenneth Ringsrød (born 22 February 1969) is a retired Norwegian football goalkeeper.

He started his career in Sarpsborg FK. He signed for Kvik Halden FK in the autumn of 1990, but instead joined Borgen IL before the start of the 1991 season. Ahead of the 1995 season he went from Sarpsborg to first-tier club Kongsvinger, where he played the season as first-choice goalkeeper. Unwanted in Kongsvinger for another season, he joined Fredrikstad and in 1997 Sarpsborg for a spell in the 1997 1. divisjon. In 2000 he was picked up by Moss FK as second-choice goalkeeper while Per Morten Kristiansen suffered from mononucleosis.

References

1969 births
Living people
Norwegian footballers
People from Sarpsborg
Sarpsborg FK players
Kvik Halden FK players
Kongsvinger IL Toppfotball players
Fredrikstad FK players
Moss FK players
Eliteserien players
Norwegian First Division players
Association football goalkeepers
Sportspeople from Viken (county)